George Haldane was born in 1722 to the Clan Haldane.  His father Patrick Haldane was a lawyer and politician, and his uncle Mungo Haldane was also a politician. Labour Party leader Jeremy Corbyn is one of his descendants.

Biography
He joined the British military at the age of 17 and quickly rose to the rank of brigadier general after leading a series of successful military campaigns as a junior officer.  He also served as Governor of Jamaica from 1756 until his death on 26 July 1759 at the age of 37.

Brigadier-General George Haldane fought in the Battle of Fontenoy in 1743, where he was wounded. He fought in the Battle of Dettingen in 1743 and he also fought in the 1745 Uprising against the Jacobites.  He gained the rank of brigadier general in the service of the 3rd Guards, and fought in the Battle of Leffelt in 1747. His final service was in the Battle of Roucoux in 1747.
After resigning his military command, Haldane held the office of Member of Parliament (M.P.) for Stirling Burghs between 1747 and 1756.

In 1759 he was appointed to the office of Governor of Jamaica. He was welcomed to the island in a poem, "An Ode to George Haldane," by Francis Williams, who went on to become one of Jamaica's most famous early writers and scholars. He died of an illness less than four months after his arrival in Jamaica.

In 1759, Fort Haldane was named in his honour and a statue erected in Port Maria, Jamaica.

References

Governors of Jamaica
1722 births
1759 deaths
Members of the Parliament of Great Britain for Scottish constituencies
British MPs 1747–1754
British MPs 1754–1761
British Army brigadiers
British Army personnel of the Jacobite rising of 1745
British Army personnel of the War of the Austrian Succession
Scots Guards officers